Blue Devil Blues  is a 1929 blues/jazz standard by Walter Page. It was first recorded in November 1929 by Page and the Oklahoma City Blue Devils, with vocals by Jimmy Rushing. It is described as "not strictly speaking a blues, but a rather simplistic, old-fashioned minor-key piece" in the key of C minor.

References

1920s jazz standards
1929 songs
Jazz compositions in C minor